The Taiwan Farmers' Party (TFP) is a minor party of Taiwan.

History
The party was established on 15 June 2007.

See also
 Elections in Taiwan
 List of political parties in Taiwan

References

External links
 Official website

Political parties in Taiwan
Political parties established in 2007
2007 establishments in Taiwan